Kim Dong-wan (born November 21, 1979) is a South Korean entertainer, known as a member of South Korean boy band Shinhwa. He has been acting since 2002, and has starred in television dramas such as A Farewell to Sorrow and Children of Heaven. He has said that given the opportunity he would prefer a career in acting rather than as a singer, However, since the release of his debut album, he has stated that now he prefers singing more. From Shinhwa, Kim is the fourth member to go solo, following Lee Min-woo, Shin Hye-sung, and Jun Jin.

Early life 
Kim was a child actor and starred in several dramas as a teenager but opted not to pursue acting as a career. He later joined S.M. Entertainment as a trainee after being "streetcasted". He was educated in Whimoon High School.

Career

1998: Debut with Shinhwa

Kim made his debut in 1998 as a vocalist in the boy band Shinhwa. Although he is not the lead vocalist, he began singing bigger parts on Shinhwa's 7th album, Brand New. In one song from the album "Liar", Kim is the vocalist, and he is accompanied by Eric Mun's rapping. He also wrote, composed, and arranged a song on the album, titled "Set Free". Though he had branched out as a solo artist, he is part of Shinhwa and just released Shinhwa's 9th album.

Kim was one of several Korean celebrities praised by the Japanese media for giving generous donations for flood victims in 2006.

On April 16, 2007, Kim appeared as a guest on MC Mong's "Pleasure and Pain" radio show. When asked about an incident early in his career where he injured his nose, he confessed that he had undergone plastic surgery to change its shape.

2007: Solo debut

Kim released his debut solo album, Kimdongwan Is, on July 5, 2007, which featured collaborations with his fellow Shinhwa members, including Lee Andy rapping in the song "Loving Summer", Shin Hye Sung singing a duet with Kim in "The One Left Alone", and Eric rapping in "My Love". The other members have contributed to the album as well, with Lee Min Woo writing, composing and arranging the song "My Love" and Jun Jin helping him with choreography. Kim expressed gratitude for their contributions, saying, "I’ve been working together with the group Shinhwa, thus there was a lot of pressure working on the solo album, but since the other members showed up and helped me with most of it, it has been a great big help for me". Kim's first single was the ballad, "Handkerchief", a song about a guy who consoles his girlfriend and wipes away her tears. Despite Shinhwa's musical genre being predominantly American R&B and bubblegum pop, Kim said he wanted his album to be more J-pop influenced, having redone a song by GLAY×EXILE in the album.

For the debut album, Kim also lost a lot of weight, saying that "it's not good for a ballad singer to have a muscular image. Someone singing ballads should have a lean, 'hungry-looking' image." His album sold over 25,000 copies in two days, with 41,490 copies sold by the end of 2007; it was ranked 19th in album sales for the year. In 2008, he released his 2nd solo album, The Secret; Between Us. The album featured collaborations with Tiffany of SNSD,  Jade Valerie, Shinhwa bandmate Eric, and Heritage.

2008-2011: Military service and musical
Kim enlisted for mandatory military service in November 2008, at an army training camp in Gongju, Chungcheongnam-do He was discharged on 17 December 2010, after serving 24 months as an administrative worker at the Seodaemun-gu District Office.

Upon being discharged Kim joined Shinhwa bandmate Shin Hye-sung at Liveworks Company and has since played the lead role of Hedwig in theatrical musical Hedwig and the Angry Inch at Sang Sang Art Hall in Seoul. In August 2011, Kim played the role of Korean independence activist, Lee Youk-sa in MBC two-part special drama, The Peak, also known as Life of Lee Youk-Sa, the Poet who Embraced Epoch. It was broadcast on Korea's Liberation Day, 15 August 2011. Lee Youk-sa was a poet during the Japanese Colonial Period who died in prison at the age of 40, leaving behind a collection of some 40 works of poetry.

2012: Shinhwa comeback and acting
In March 2012, Kim reunited with his Shinhwa bandmates for their comeback after four years, under the management of 'Shinhwa Company'. It is a joint venture agency for members to perform as a group, of which Eric and Lee Min-woo are co-CEOs and the remaining members are shareholders. The Company manages the group as a whole, whilst members' individual activities are managed by their respective agencies. The group released their tenth studio album The Return on 23 March 2012, launched their comeback concerts 2012 Shinhwa Grand Tour: The Return throughout Asia and their first exclusive variety program Shinhwa Broadcast premiered on 17 March 2012 on cable channel JTBC.

In July, Kim co-starred with Kim Myung-min and Lee Ha-nui in thriller Deranged as Jae-pil,  a detective agonized with guilt for squandering his brother's money in the stock market. In August, Kim was cast as the title role of Kim Tae-pyung in KBS' daily drama, Cheer Up, Mr. Kim!, about a male domestic cleaner and housekeeper, the guardian of three, later four, children, none of whom are his own. The series premiered in November and marked Kim's first television drama since Good Bye, Sadness in 2005. At the 2012 KBS Drama Awards, Kim received the Best Actor in Daily Drama award for his portrayal of Mr Kim.

2015: Philanthropy
In April 2015, after the earthquake in Nepal, Kim was reported to have donated ₩36,000,000 (equivalent to approximately $33,660 USD) towards the relief fund.

Discography

Studio albums

Mini albums

Compilation albums

Singles

Video albums

Filmography

Television dramas 
 2001 – Nonstop
 2002 – Children of Heaven KBS
 2005 – "Magic Power Alcohol" – MBC Best Theater (Episode #610)
 2005 – Beating Heart
 2005 – A Farewell to Sorrow, aka A Farewell to Tears or Goodbye Sadness KBS
 2007 – The One I Love, aka The Person That I Love or I Will Not Love
 2011 – The Peak (aka Life of Lee Yuksa, the Poet who Embraced Epoch)
 2012 – Cheer Up, Mr. Kim! (KBS)
 2016 - Moorim School: Saga of the Brave (Episodes 10 & 11)
 2017 - Drama Stage – The Picnic Day (tvN one-act drama)  
 2019 - I Hate Going to Work  (KBS2)

Film 
 2002 – Emergency Act 19 – cameo with Shinhwa
 2004 – Spin Kick, aka Taekwon Boys
 2012 – Deranged - as Jae-pil, an investigator and younger brother of Jae-hyuk, played by Kim Myung-min
 2015 – Springtime Fantasy
 2015 – Glory Day
 2015 – The Megalomaniac
 2021 – A Long Day
 2022 – B Cut - as Seung Hyun
 2022 – The Clown: The Singer as Fallen Yangban

Variety shows
 2003 Yoon Do-Hyun's Love Letter “Lately” – KBS
 2004 Yoon Do-Hyun's Love Letter “Cigarette Shop Girl” – KBS
 2005 Public Relations – Officer of JeonJu International Film Festival
 2005 Love Letter (ep 1 to 14) – SBS
 2005 X-Man – SBS
 2006 Heroine 6
 2006 New X-Man – SBS
 2012 - 2013 Shinhwa Broadcast (ep 1 - 49) - JTBC
 2015 I Live Alone (ep 99 - 150) - MBC
 2015 King of Mask Singer Contestant with the stage name "Holding the End of the Night" (Episode 29-30) - MBC
 2018 Worldwide Correspondence - TVN
 2018 Battle Trip - KBS
 2018 2 Days & 1 Night - (ep 705 - 706) - KBS
 2021 Chosun Panstar - MBN (judge)

MC 
 2000–2002: DJ for Ten Ten Club
 2003–2005: Host for SBS Inkigayo
 2006: Host for SBS I Love My Teacher Day Concert
 2018: Host for Worldwide Correspondence of TVN

Theater

Awards and nominations

References

External links 

  
https://www.youtube.com/channel/UCNwjaN9w8W2RnZqbE4A0UcA ( in Korean)

1979 births
Living people
Male actors from Seoul
Shinhwa members
South Korean male film actors
South Korean male television actors
South Korean male singers
South Korean male idols
South Korean J-pop singers
South Korean pop singers
CI Entertainment artists
Singers from Seoul
Whimoon High School alumni